European Route E 117 is part of the International E-road network, which is a series of main roads in Europe.

Description 
The E 117 starts from Mineralnye Vody, Russia, via the Georgian Military Road to Georgia's capital Tbilisi, via the Armenian capital Yerevan and on to Meghri on the border of Iran.

Between Mineralnye Vody and Beslan, it is concurrent with E 50 and Russian highway M29.

Route 

: (Concurrent with ): Mineralnye Vody – Pyatigorsk – Baksan – Nalchik – Beslan
: Beslan - Vladikavkaz – Nizhniy Lars

: Larsi - Mtskheta
: Mtskheta - Tbilisi
: Tbilisi - Marneuli – Bolnisi - Kazreti - Guguti

: Gogavan - Vanadzor - Ashtarak
: Ashtarak – Yerevan
: Yerevan – Artashat - Yeraskh – Goris – (a section passes through ) – Kapan – Kajaran – Meghri - Agarak

: Nurduz

References

External links 
 UN Economic Commission for Europe: Overall Map of E-road Network (2007)

199117
E117
E117
E117